Hypochilus is a genus of North American lampshade spiders that was first described by George Marx in 1888.

Species
 it contains 11 species, all found in the United States:
Hypochilus bernardino Catley, 1994 – USA
Hypochilus bonneti Gertsch, 1964 – USA
Hypochilus coylei Platnick, 1987 – USA
Hypochilus gertschi Hoffman, 1963 – USA
Hypochilus jemez Catley, 1994 – USA
Hypochilus kastoni Platnick, 1987 – USA
Hypochilus petrunkevitchi Gertsch, 1958 – USA
Hypochilus pococki Platnick, 1987 – USA
Hypochilus sheari Platnick, 1987 – USA
Hypochilus thorelli Marx, 1888 (type) – USA
Hypochilus xomote (Hedin & Ciaccio, 2022) – USA

References

Araneomorphae genera
Hypochilidae
Spiders of the United States